Baruol synthase (BARS1) is an enzyme with systematic name (3S)-2,3-epoxy-2,3-dihydrosqualene mutase (cyclizing, baruol-forming). This enzyme catalyses the following chemical reaction

 (3S)-2,3-epoxy-2,3-dihydrosqualene  baruol

The enzyme from Arabidopsis thaliana also produces traces of 22 other triterpenoids.

References

External links 
 

EC 5.4.99